The 1976–77 Magyar Kupa (English: Hungarian Cup) was the 37th season of Hungary's annual knock-out cup football competition. The Finals were played in a round-robin tournament format.

Finals

See also
 1976–77 Nemzeti Bajnokság I

References

External links
 Official site 
 soccerway.com

1976–77 in Hungarian football
1976–77 domestic association football cups
1976-77